Elena Piron (born 21 March 1960) is a Romanian volleyball player. She competed in the women's tournament at the 1980 Summer Olympics.

References

1960 births
Living people
Romanian women's volleyball players
Olympic volleyball players of Romania
Volleyball players at the 1980 Summer Olympics
Place of birth missing (living people)